This is a list of 135 species in Microstylum, a genus of robber flies in the family Asilidae.

Microstylum species

 Microstylum acutirostre Loew, 1852 c g
 Microstylum albimystaecum Macquart, 1855 c g
 Microstylum albolimbatum Wulp, 1898 c g
 Microstylum amoyense Bigot, 1878 c g
 Microstylum ananthakrishnani Joseph & Parui, 1984 c g
 Microstylum anovense Oldroyd, 1980 c g
 Microstylum apicale (Wiedemann, 1821) c g
 Microstylum apiforme (Walker, 1851) c g
 Microstylum appendiculatum Macquart, 1847 c g
 Microstylum atrorubens Timon-David, 1952 c g
 Microstylum balbillus (Walker, 1849) c g
 Microstylum barbarosa (Wiedemann, 1828) c g
 Microstylum basalis Brunetti, 1928 c g
 Microstylum basirufum Bigot, 1878 c g
 Microstylum bhattacharyai Joseph & Parui, 1984 c g
 Microstylum bicolor Macquart, 1850 c g
 Microstylum biggsi Oldroyd, 1960 c g
 Microstylum bloesum (Walker, 1849) c g
 Microstylum braunsi Engel, 1932 c g
 Microstylum brevipennatum Bigot, 1878 c g
 Microstylum bromleyi Timon-David, 1952 c g
 Microstylum brunnipenne Macquart, 1850 c g
 Microstylum capense (Fabricius, 1805) c g
 Microstylum capucinum Bigot, 1878 c g
 Microstylum catastygnum Papavero, 1971 c g
 Microstylum cilipes Macquart, 1838 c g
 Microstylum cinctum Bromley, 1931 c g
 Microstylum coimbatorensis Joseph & Parui, 1987 c g
 Microstylum decretus (Walker, 1860) c g
 Microstylum difficile (Wiedemann, 1828) c g
 Microstylum dispar Loew, 1858 c g
 Microstylum dux (Wiedemann, 1828) c g
 Microstylum elongatum Bigot, 1878 c g
 Microstylum erythropygum Bigot, 1878 c g
 Microstylum eximiun Bigot, 1878 c g
 Microstylum fafner (Enderlein, 1914) c g
 Microstylum fenestratum (Wiedemann, 1828) c g
 Microstylum flavipenne Macquart, 1846 c g
 Microstylum flaviventre Macquart, 1850 c g
 Microstylum fulvicaudatum Bigot, 1878 c g
 Microstylum fulviventre Wulp, 1898 c g
 Microstylum galactodes Loew, 1866 i c g b
 Microstylum gigas (Wiedemann, 1821) c g
 Microstylum gladiator Bromley, 1927 c g
 Microstylum griseum Bromley, 1927 c g
 Microstylum gulosum Loew, 1858 c g
 Microstylum haemorrhoidale Bigot, 1878 c g
 Microstylum helenae Bezzi, 1914 c g
 Microstylum hermanni Ricardo, 1925 c g
 Microstylum hiritipes Ricardo, 1925 c g
 Microstylum hobbyi Bromley, 1947 c g
 Microstylum imbutum (Walker, 1851) c g
 Microstylum incomptum (Walker, 1856) c g
 Microstylum indutum Rondani, 1875 c g
 Microstylum insigne Bromley, 1927 c g
 Microstylum lacteipenne (Wiedemann, 1828) c g
 Microstylum lambertoni Bromley, 1931 c g
 Microstylum leucacanthum Bezzi, 1908 c g
 Microstylum libo Walker, 1849 c g
 Microstylum lituratum Loew, 1863 c g
 Microstylum luciferoides Bromley, 1942 c g
 Microstylum luciferum Bromley, 1931 c g
 Microstylum lugubre (Wiedemann, 1828) c g
 Microstylum magnum Bromley, 1927 c g
 Microstylum marudamalaiensis Joseph & Parui, 1987 c g
 Microstylum melanomystax Enderlein, 1914 c g
 Microstylum mexicanus Martin, 1960 c g
 Microstylum miles Karsch, 1879 c g
 Microstylum morosum Loew, 1872 i c g b
 Microstylum mydas Engel, 1932 c g
 Microstylum nigrescens Ricardo, 1900 c g
 Microstylum nigribarbatum Bigot, 1878 c g
 Microstylum nigricauda (Wiedemann, 1824) c g
 Microstylum nigricorne Enderlein, 1914 c g
 Microstylum nigricuada (Wiedemann, 1824) c g
 Microstylum nigrimystaceum Ricardo, 1925 c g
 Microstylum nigrinum Enderlein, 1914 c g
 Microstylum nigrisetosum Efflatoun, 1937 c g
 Microstylum nigritarse Bromley, 1927 c g
 Microstylum nigrostriatum Hobby, 1933 c g
 Microstylum nigrum Bigot, 1859 c g
 Microstylum nitidiventre Bigot, 1878 c g
 Microstylum oberthurii Wulp, 1896 c g
 Microstylum otacilius (Walker, 1849) c g
 Microstylum parcum Karsch, 1888 c g
 Microstylum partitum (Walker, 1856) c
 Microstylum pauliani Timon-David, 1952 c g
 Microstylum pica Macquart, 1846 c g
 Microstylum pollex Oldroyd, 1970 c g
 Microstylum polygnotus (Walker, 1849) c g
 Microstylum proclive (Walker, 1860) c g
 Microstylum proximum Oldroyd, 1960 c g
 Microstylum pseudoananthakrishnani Joseph & Parui, 1989 c g
 Microstylum pulchrum Bromley, 1927 c g
 Microstylum rabodae Karsch, 1884 c g
 Microstylum radamae Karsch, 1884 c g
 Microstylum remicorne Loew, 1863 c g
 Microstylum rhypae (Walker, 1849) c g
 Microstylum ricardoae Oldroyd, 1970 c g
 Microstylum rubigenis Bromley, 1927 c g
 Microstylum rubripes Macquart, 1838 c g
 Microstylum rufianale (Macquart, 1850) c g
 Microstylum rufinevrum Macquart, 1855 c g
 Microstylum rufoabdominalis Brunetti, 1928 c g
 Microstylum rufum Ricardo, 1925 c g
 Microstylum sagitta Bigot, 1878 c g
 Microstylum saverrio (Walker, 1849) c g
 Microstylum scython (Walker, 1849) c g
 Microstylum seguyi Timon-David, 1952 c g
 Microstylum sessile Bezzi, 1908 c g
 Microstylum simplicissimum Loew, 1852 c g
 Microstylum sordidum Walker, 1854 c g
 Microstylum spectrum (Wiedemann, 1828) c g
 Microstylum spinipes Ricardo, 1925 c g
 Microstylum spurinum (Walker, 1849) c g
 Microstylum strigatum Enderlein, 1914 c g
 Microstylum sumatranum Enderlein, 1914 c g
 Microstylum sura (Walker, 1849) c g
 Microstylum taeniatum (Wiedemann, 1828) c g
 Microstylum tananarivense Bromley, 1931 c g
 Microstylum testaceum (Macquart, 1846) c
 Microstylum trimelas (Walker, 1851) c g
 Microstylum umbrosum Bromley, 1931 c g
 Microstylum unicolor Ricardo, 1925 c g
 Microstylum ustulatum Engel & Cuthbertson, 1938 c g
 Microstylum validum Loew, 1858 c g
 Microstylum varipennatum Bigot, 1878 c g
 Microstylum varshneyi Joseph & Parui, 1984 c g
 Microstylum venosum (Wiedemann, 1821) c g
 Microstylum vespertilio Engel, 1932 c g
 Microstylum vestitum Rondani, 1875 c g
 Microstylum vica (Walker, 1849) c g
 Microstylum villosum Bigot, 1878 c g
 Microstylum vulcan Bromley, 1928 c g
 Microstylum whitei Brunetti, 1928 c g

Data sources: i = ITIS, c = Catalogue of Life, g = GBIF, b = Bugguide.net

References

Microstylum
Articles created by Qbugbot